Beta-1,3-N-acetylglucosaminyltransferase manic fringe is an enzyme that in humans is encoded by the MFNG gene,
a member of the fringe gene family which also includes the radical fringe (RFNG) and lunatic fringe (LFNG).

They all encode evolutionarily conserved proteins that act in the Notch receptor pathway to demarcate boundaries during embryonic development. While their genomic structure is distinct from other glycosyltransferases, fringe proteins have a fucose-specific beta1,3 N-acetylglucosaminyltransferase activity that leads to elongation of O-linked fucose residues on Notch, which alters Notch signaling.

References

Further reading